Alderney forms part of the Bailiwick of Guernsey and since 1969 when Royal Mail relinquished authority to Guernsey Post has relied on postal services provided by Guernsey. In 1983 Guernsey Post issued its first stamps designated Alderney.

History

Alderney is the second largest island in the Bailiwick of Guernsey. Guernsey Post has issued postage stamps since its creation in 1969 when the postal service was separated from the Royal Mail.

In 1983 Guernsey issued its first stamps designated Alderney, for use from Alderney, although they are valid for use from any island in the Bailiwick of Guernsey.

Postage stamps issued

1983 - 1999

2000 - 2009

2010 -

See also

 Postage stamps and postal history of Guernsey
 List of postage stamps of Guernsey
 Postage stamps and postal history of Jersey

References

External links
 Alderney Stamps

A